William Symonds was a British Surveyor of the Navy in the 19th century.

William Symonds may also refer to:

William Symonds (priest) (1556–1616), English supporter of the Virginia colony
William Cornwallis Symonds (1810–1841), British Army officer 
William R. Symonds (1851–1934), English painter
William Samuel Symonds (1818–1887), English geologist

See also
William Simonds (disambiguation)